The 2013 German Athletics Championships were held at the Donaustadion in Ulm on 6–7 July 2013.

Results

Men

Women

References

External links 
 Official website of the 2013 German Athletics Championships 
 Full results  

2013
2013 in athletics (track and field)
2013 in German sport